Hazel Holt (nee Young, 3 September 1928 – 23 November 2015) was a British novelist.

She studied at King Edward VI High School for Girls in Birmingham, England, and then Newnham College, Cambridge. She went on to work at the International African Institute in London, where she became acquainted with the novelist Barbara Pym, whose biography she later wrote.  She also finished one of Pym's novels after Pym died. Holt wrote My Dear Charlotte, a story that uses the actual language of Jane Austen's letters to her sister Cassandra to construct a Regency murder mystery.

Holt wrote her first novel in her sixties, and was a leading crime novelist. She is best known for her Sheila Malory series. She was also a regular contributor to The Stage for some years.  She married Geoffrey Louis Holt (1924-2010) in 1951; their son is novelist Tom Holt.

Bibliography
 A Lot To Ask: A Life of Barbara Pym (1990)
 My Dear Charlotte (2010)

Sheila Malory
 Gone Away [US title Mrs Malory Investigates] (1989)
 The Cruellest Month (1991)
 The Shortest Journey (1992)
 An Uncertain Death (1993)
 Murder on Campus (1994)
 Superfluous Death (1995)
 Death of a Dean (1996)
 The Only Good Lawyer... (1997)
 Dead and Buried (1998)
 Fatal Legacy (1999)
 Lilies That Fester (2000)
 Leonora (2002)
 Delay of Execution (2001)
 Death in Practice (2003)
 The Silent Killer (2004)
 No Cure for Death (2005)
 Death in the Family (2006)
 A Time to Die (2008)
 Mrs. Malory and Any Man's Death (2009)
 Mrs. Malory and a Necessary End (2012)
 Death is a Word (2014)

References

External links
Hazel Holt at Fantastic Fiction

1928 births
2015 deaths
Alumni of Newnham College, Cambridge
20th-century English novelists
21st-century English novelists
20th-century English women writers
21st-century English women writers
English women novelists
English biographers
English mystery writers
Women mystery writers
Writers of historical mysteries
Women historical novelists
English women non-fiction writers
Women biographers